The proportionality bias is the tendency to assume that big events have big causes. It is a type of cognitive bias and plays an important role in people's tendency to accept conspiracy theories. Academic psychologist Rob Brotherton summarises it as “When something big happens, we tend to assume that something big must have caused it”.

Notes 

Cognitive biases
Cognition